Moseleya is a genus of cnidarians belonging to the family Lobophylliidae.

The species of this genus are found in Australia.

Species
Species:

Moseleya latistellata 
Moseleya minor

References

Lobophylliidae
Scleractinia genera